Bernhard Bergmeyer (22 June 1897 – 2 March 1987) was a German politician of the Christian Democratic Union (CDU) and former member of the German Bundestag.

Life 
In 1949 he was appointed professor of economics at the American University of Notre Dame, but returned to Germany in 1951 to take over the management of Honselwerke AG in Meschede.

From 1953 to 1961 Bergmeyer, who had joined the CDU in 1953, was a member of the German Bundestag.

Literature

References

1897 births
1987 deaths
Members of the Bundestag for North Rhine-Westphalia
Members of the Bundestag 1957–1961
Members of the Bundestag 1953–1957
Members of the Bundestag for the Christian Democratic Union of Germany